Highway 336 (AR 336, Ark. 336, and Hwy. 336) is a designation for two east–west state highways in the Arkansas Ozarks. Both are low traffic, two-lane, highways near Greers Ferry Lake. The first segment of Highway 336, also around Greers Ferry Lake, was created in 1965 but returned to local maintenance in 2013. The longer segment was created in 1966, with the Higden segment created in 1972. Both current segments are maintained by the Arkansas Department of Transportation (ArDOT).

Route description
The ArDOT maintains Highway 336 like all other parts of the state highway system. As a part of these responsibilities, the Department tracks the volume of traffic using its roads in surveys using a metric called average annual daily traffic (AADT). ArDOT estimates the traffic level for a segment of roadway for any average day of the year in these surveys. As of 2018, estimates were 850 vehicles per day (VPD) near Culpepper and 460 VPD near the western terminus. As of 2018, estimates in Higden were 260 VPD. Highways under 400 VPD are classified as very low volume local road by the American Association of State Highway and Transportation Officials (AASHTO).

No segment of Highway 336 is part of the National Highway System (NHS), a network of roads important to the nation's economy, defense, and mobility.

Van Buren County
Highway 336 begins in the unincorporated community of Formosa in southern Van Buren County near the Conway County line. The road winds through a rural area, crossing Wolf Pen Hollow before climbing Culpepper Mountain, where it passes the community of Culpepper. The route runs northeast to U.S. Highway 65 (US 65, and an unsigned Highway 9) in Clinton where it terminates near the Ozark Health Medical Center.

Cleburne County
A second segment of Highway 336 begins in the small town of Higden within Cleburne County at an intersection with Highway 16 near Greers Ferry Lake. The highway runs due north as Higden Road through a residential area before turning slightly west toward the lake. State maintenance ends along the curve, with the roadway continuing as a city street.

Major intersections

History

Current designations
The Arkansas State Highway Commission designated a second segment of Highway 336 along a county road between US 65 and Culpepper on January 12, 1966. The Higden segment was designated on October 25, 1972 to restore Higden's access to the state highway system following the creation of Greers Ferry Lake. Highway 366 was extended from Culpepper to the western terminus on May 23, 1973 following Act 9 of 1973 by the Arkansas General Assembly.

Former designation

The first alignment of Highway 336 was created by the Highway Commission on June 23, 1965. The designation followed an existing county road, beginning at an intersection with US 65/Highway 9 and running east approximately  through Green Tree to a cul-de-sac on a bluff above Greers Ferry Lake.

The highway was returned to local maintenance in December 2013. The Highway Commission utilized a policy that allows returning state highways to local control to offset the costs of non-reimbursable utility relocation where small water utilities do not have necessary funds to relocate their lines along important highway projects. Van Buren County assumed maintenance of Highway 336 (and a segment of Highway 330) following verification that the Bee Branch Water Association and Dennard Water Association would not be able to afford relocation of their water mains along US 65, which was widened under the Connecting Arkansas Program.

See also

References

 
 

336
336
State highways in the United States shorter than one mile
Transportation in Van Buren County, Arkansas
Transportation in Cleburne County, Arkansas